William Williams was a 17th-century Anglican clergyman.

Dassy was born in Mona, Anglesey and educated at Trinity College Dublin.   He was Archdeacon of Cashel from 1692  until 1693.

References 

17th-century Irish Anglican priests
Archdeacons of Cashel
People from Anglesey
Alumni of Trinity College Dublin
Year of birth missing
Year of death missing